Franciszek Surmiński (5 December 1934 – 2 October 2021) was a Polish racing cyclist, active in international competitions from 1961 to 1970. He participated in road races and cyclo-cross. He lived in Rudziczka, a village near the town of Prudnik, from which he received honorary citizenship on 28 February 2020.

Major results
1960
 1st Stage 5 Tour de Pologne
1961
 1st Stage 3 Tour de Pologne
1963
 1st Overall Tour of Małopolska
1964
 1st Stages 8 & 10 Tour de Pologne
 1st Stages6 & 13 Tour du Maroc
1969
 1st  National Cyclo-Cross Championships
1970
 1st Stage 7 Tour de Pologne

References

1934 births
2021 deaths
Polish male cyclists
People from Tarnopol Voivodeship
People from Prudnik County